Driaan Bruwer (born 6 January 1995) is a South African first-class cricketer. He was part of South Africa's squad for the 2014 ICC Under-19 Cricket World Cup. He was included in the Free State cricket team squad for the 2015 Africa T20 Cup. He made his List A debut for Free State in the 2016–17 CSA Provincial One-Day Challenge on 9 October 2016.

References

External links
 

1995 births
Living people
South African cricketers
Cricketers from Pretoria